The 1991 England Challenge Cup was a friendly association football tournament played over the course of a week in May 1991 in England. Wembley Stadium in London and Old Trafford in Manchester were the two venues used. The three way tournament contained the national teams of England, Argentina, and the USSR. England were the tournament winners.

Venues

Results
All times listed are British Summer Time (UTC+1)

England vs Soviet Union

Argentina vs Soviet Union

Sergio Goycochea saved a penalty from Igor Dobrovolski during the first half when the score was 0–0.

England vs Argentina

Standings

Goalscorers
3 goals
 David Platt

1 goal
 Darío Franco
 Claudio García
 Igor Kolivanov
 Gary Lineker
 Oscar Ruggeri
 Alan Smith
 Vladimir Tatarchuk

External links
Challenge Cup 1991 (England)

1991
1990–91 in English football
1990–91 in Argentine football
1991 in Soviet football